The 2022 MAAC women's soccer tournament was the postseason women's soccer tournament for the Metro Atlantic Athletic Conference held from October 30 through November 6, 2022. The five-match tournament took place at campus sites, with the higher seed hosting matches.  The host for the matches was determined by seeding from regular season play.  The six-team single-elimination tournament consisted of three rounds based on seeding from regular season conference play. The Monmouth Hawks were the defending champions and were unable to defend their title, as they moved conferences to the Colonial Athletic Association beginning in the 2022 season.  The Quinnipiac Bobcats won the title by defeating Niagara 4–0 in the final.  This is Quinnipiac's first overall tournament win in program history.  The title is also the first for head coach Dave Clarke.  As tournament champions, Quinnipiac earned the MAAC's automatic berth into the 2022 NCAA Division I women's soccer tournament.

Seeding 
Six MAAC League schools participated in the tournament. Teams were seeded by conference record.  A tiebreaker was required to determine the first and second seed for the tournament as Quinnipiac and Fairfield finished with identical 9–1–0 regular season records.  Quinnipiac defeated Fairfield 3–2 on October 1, 2022, and therefore Quinnipiac was the first seed and Fairfield was the second seed.

Bracket

Semifinal matchups were determined by the results of the quarterfinals. The #1 seed would play the lowest-remaining seed, while the #2 seed would play the other quarterfinal winner.

Schedule

Quarterfinals

Semifinals

Final

Statistics

Goalscorers

All-Tournament team
Source:

MVP in bold

References 

2022 Metro Atlantic Athletic Conference women's soccer season
Metro Atlantic Athletic Conference Women's Soccer Tournament